María Alessandra Mezquita Lapadula is a pageant titleholder, was born in Ciudad de Panamá, Panamá on November 11, 1983. She was the official representative of Panamá in the 55th Miss Universe 2006 pageant, which was held at the Shrine Auditorium in Los Angeles, USA, on July 23, 2006.

She represented Panamá Centro state.

Mezquita, who graduated with a degree in Mass Media Studies from Florida State University, which included a minor in Sports Management in May 2005, wento on to work as a Sports Reporter for RPC Panamá where she covered events such as CONCACAF Gold Cup 2011, FIFA U20 World Cup Colombia 2011, London Olympic Games 2012, Final Draw for the 2014 FIFA World Cup Brazil, and World Cup Qualifiers for the Panamá National Team.

References

External links
 Señorita Panamá  official website

 Alessandra Mezquita official website

1983 births
Living people
Señorita Panamá
Panamanian beauty pageant winners
Miss Universe 2006 contestants